Alexander Nicholas Davison (12 February 1923 – 20 February 1965) was a racing driver who won the Australian Grand Prix four times between 1954 and 1961 and won the Australian Drivers' Championship in 1957. He drove HWM-Jaguar, Ferrari, Aston Martin and Cooper-Climax grand prix cars.

Davison won Class A of the 1960 Armstrong 500, forerunner of the Bathurst 1000, driving an NSU Prinz.

He competed at the 1961 24 Hours of Le Mans with Bib Stillwell in an Aston Martin DB4GT Zagato. Davison and Stillwell were invited to race for the Essex Racing Stable due to their involvement with Aston Martins in the Australian racing scene. Davison had finished second in the 1960 Australian Grand Prix and fourth in the Australian Gold Star Championship in an Aston Martin DBR4/300. Their Le Mans adventure ended prematurely when a blown head gasket saw them retire on lap 25.

Davison won the GT support race at the 1961 British Grand Prix at Aintree driving an Aston Martin DB4 GT Zagato. He finished sixth in the 1961 Guards Trophy driving an Aston Martin DBR4/300 and placed tenth in the Intercontinental Championship.

On 20 February 1965 Davison died in a crash during practice for the 1965 International 100 at Sandown International Raceway. While accelerating through the dog leg of the back straight in his 2.5L Brabham Climax he suffered a heart attack. The car left the road at over 160 km/h, hit a culvert, somersaulted and crashed through a horse railing fence. Davison sustained severe head injuries and was dead when officials reached him.

Davison was the husband of female racing driver Diana Davison and father of Australian racing drivers Jon Davison and Richard Davison and grandfather of Alex Davison, Will Davison and James Davison.

Drivers who win the Australian Grand Prix are awarded the Lex Davison Trophy, so named to honour Davison who was the first 4-time winner of the event (the only other 4-time winner is 7-time World Champion Michael Schumacher). This trophy, designed and made in Britain by Mr Rex Hays to the order of CAMS, incorporates a silver model of the Austin 7 driven to victory in the first Australian Grand Prix in 1928.

Career results

Notes 

1923 births
1965 deaths
24 Hours of Le Mans drivers
Racing drivers from Melbourne
Tasman Series drivers
World Sportscar Championship drivers